Mindwarp is a Doctor Who serial.

Mindwarp may also refer to:

Mindwarp (novel), a novel by James Follett
Earthsearch Mindwarp, a radio series based on the Follett novel
Zodiac Mindwarp and the Love Reaction, an English hard rock band of the 1980s
Mindwarp (film) a 1992 film
Mindwarp, a character from the DC Comics series Secret Seven